VfR is a German-language acronym that may appear in various contexts:

Verein für Raumschiffahrt, en:Society for Space Travel, a historical amateur rocket club in Germany
 Verein für Rasensport	(en:Association for Field Sports) or Verein für Rasenspiele (en:Association for Field Games), a commonly used term for German Sport clubs, as in VfR Mannheim